Shabana Khan (born 24 June 1968) is a female former professional squash player who represented the United States. She reached a career-high world ranking of 23 in January 2000. She was American champion in 2001. She comes from a squash family: her father is a cousin of squash legend Jahangir Khan and her sister Latasha Khan is also a former professional squash player.

References

1968 births
Living people
American female squash players
21st-century American women